Dame Leslie Violet Lucy Evelyn Whateley, DBE, TD (née Wood; first married name Balfour; 28 January 1899 – 4 July 1987) was a Director of the Auxiliary Territorial Service (ATS) during the Second World War.

Early life
She was born on 28 January 1899, the daughter of Col. Evelyn FitzGerald Michell Wood and Lilian (née Hutton). She was the granddaughter of Field-Marshal Sir Evelyn Wood.

Career
Whateley joined the Auxiliary Territorial Service in 1938 and became a junior officer following training at Chelsea Barracks. She served as Deputy Director of the ATS from September 1941. She was Director of the World Association of Girl Guides and Girl Scouts from 1951 to 1964.

In 1948, her writings were published by Hutchinson Publishing in Melbourne entitled As thoughts survive, a monograph with a preface by the then-Princess Royal.

Marriages

She married, firstly, to William John Balfour, on 8 July 1922. The union ended in divorce in 1939. She married, secondly, to S/Ldr Harry Raymond Whateley, on 21 September 1939. Both unions were childless.

Honours
In June 1951, she was awarded the Territorial Efficiency Decoration (TD) for long service in the reserves.

In 1965, she was awarded the Bronze Wolf, the only distinction of the World Organization of the Scout Movement, awarded by the World Scout Committee "for exceptional services to world Scouting".

References

External links
 Oxford Biography Index Number 101045561
 Answers.com

 

1899 births
1987 deaths
Auxiliary Territorial Service officers
British Army generals of World War II
Recipients of the Bronze Wolf Award
Dames Commander of the Order of the British Empire
World Association of Girl Guides and Girl Scouts
People from Paddington
Military personnel from London
International Scouting leaders
Female army generals